U.S. Route 11 (US 11) is a north–south United States Numbered Highway in western Virginia. At , it is the second longest numbered route (after US 58) and longest primarily north–south route in the state. It enters the state from Tennessee as the divided routes US 11E and US 11W at Bristol, roughly follows the West Virginia border through the Blue Ridge Mountains and Shenandoah Valley, and enters the Eastern Panhandle of West Virginia from Frederick County. Most of the route closely parallels I-81. From south to north, US 11 serves the cities and towns of Bristol, Abingdon, Wytheville, Christiansburg, Roanoke, Lexington, Staunton, Harrisonburg, Strasburg, and Winchester. As one of the original U.S. Highways, it was first designated through Virginia in 1926 and has largely followed the same route since. Prior to the construction of the Interstate Highway System, it was the primary long-distance route for traversing the western part of the state. Much of it roughly follows the Great Wagon Road, a colonial-era road that followed the Appalachian Mountains from Georgia to Pennsylvania.

Route description

Virginia's portion of US 11 begins at the four-way intersection of east–west Euclid Avenue and north–south Commonwealth Avenue in Bristol. At this intersection, a pair of divided U.S. Highways, US 11W and US 11E, merge to form mainline US 11. US 11W and US 11E parallel each other through East Tennessee to Knoxville, where the divided routes merge to form mainline US 11 again. The west leg of the intersection features southbound US 11W and northbound US 421. The U.S. Highways split at the Tennessee state line; US 11W heads southwest toward Kingsport, Tennessee, while US 421 soon joins US 58 west toward Gate City. The south leg of the intersection includes southbound US 11E, southbound US 19, southbound US 421, and southbound SR 381. At the Tennessee state line at State Street in downtown Bristol, SR 381 has its southern terminus, US 421 turns east toward Mountain City, Tennessee, and US 11E and US 19 continue south to Johnson City, Tennessee. The north leg of the intersection is SR 381, which is a state-numbered, street-level continuation of I-381, a spur south from I-81.

US 11 and US 19 head east as a two-lane divided boulevard through a residential area. The street becomes undivided shortly before the U.S. Highways reach the northern end of SR 113 (Moore Street), which heads south toward Virginia Intermont College and downtown Bristol. US 11 and US 19 continue northeast on Lee Highway, which, here and in much of Virginia is a three-lane road with center turn lane. The highway meets I-81 and US 58 at a diamond interchange with a rakish angle. US 11 and US 19 pass under Norfolk Southern Railway's Pulaski District and cross Beaver Creek before leaving the city of Bristol. The two highways continue northeast through Washington County, where they pass Virginia Highlands Airport before entering the town of Abingdon. At the west end of town, US 11 and US 19 intersect SR 140 (Jonesboro Road), a connector between the U.S. Highways and I-81 that also serves Virginia Highlands Community College. The U.S. highways continue east as Main Street, which passes under the Norfolk Southern Railway line before US 19 turns north onto Porterfield Highway. US 11 becomes four lanes and then two at its intersection with US 58 Alternate (US 58 Alt.; Russell Street), which leads to the William King Museum of Art, in downtown Abingdon. The alternate route runs along Main Street for a short distance before turning south with SR 75 (Cummings Street) to rejoin US 58 at I-81. US 11 passes Barter Theatre. At the east end of town, US 11 crosses over the rail line and meets I-81 at a partial cloverleaf interchange. US 11 has a short concurrency with US 58 east of the interchange before US 58 splits to the east as Jeb Stuart Highway.

US 11 meets the southern end of SR 80 (Glenbrook Avenue) south of the communities of Meadowview and Emory; the latter village is the home of Emory and Henry College. The U.S. Highway intersects SR 91 (Maple Street) south of Glade Spring before the highway closely parallels I-81. US 11 has an interchange with I-81 where the highway crosses to the north side of the Interstate shortly before entering Smyth County.

History
What is now US 11 was added to the state highway system in 1918 as portions of SR 10 (Bristol to Roanoke) and SR 3 (Roanoke to West Virginia). SR 3 became SR 33 in 1923, and US 11 was applied to its present alignment in 1926. SR 10 and SR 33 vere dropped in 1933.

Major intersections

See also
Spurs of US 11 in Virginia
U.S. Route 11E,  to present
U.S. Route 11W,  to present
U.S. Route 211, 1926 to present
U.S. Route 311, 1926 to mid-1930s, now part of U.S. Route 220
U.S. Route 411, 1926 to early 1930s, now part of U.S. Route 58
U.S. Route 411, mid-1930s to late 1970s, now U.S. Route 11E
U.S. Route 11 Business (Virginia)

References

External links

Virginia Highways Project: US 11
US 11 in VA at AARoads

11
 Virginia
U.S. Route 011
U.S. Route 011
U.S. Route 011
U.S. Route 011
U.S. Route 011
U.S. Route 011
U.S. Route 011
U.S. Route 011
U.S. Route 011
U.S. Route 011
U.S. Route 011
U.S. Route 011
U.S. Route 011
U.S. Route 011
U.S. Route 011
U.S. Route 011
U.S. Route 011
U.S. Route 011
U.S. Route 011
U.S. Route 011
U.S. Route 011
Transportation in Stephens City, Virginia